The following is a list of records attained in French Football Ligue 1 since the league foundation in 1932.

Club statistics

Titles and points
Most titles: 10, Paris Saint-Germain & Saint-Étienne
Most consecutive titles: 7, Lyon (2002–2008)
Most points in a single season: 96, Paris Saint-Germain (2015–16)

Wins and unbeaten runs
Most wins in a single season: 
38-match season: 30, Paris Saint-Germain (2015–16) and Monaco (2016–17)
34-match season: 25, Saint-Étienne (1969–70)
Most home victories in a single season: 19, Saint-Étienne (1974–75)
Most away victories in a single season: 15, Paris Saint-Germain (2015–16)
Most consecutive victories: 16, Monaco (between 25 February 2017 and 17 August 2017)
Most consecutive victories in a single season: 14, Paris Saint-Germain (2018–19)
Most consecutive home victories: 28, Saint-Étienne (between 13 March 1974 and 27 August 1975)
Most consecutive away victories: 9, Marseille (between 15 February 2009 and 8 August 2009)
Biggest win: Sochaux 12–1 Valenciennes (1 July 1935)
Biggest away win: Troyes 0–9 Paris Saint-Germain (13 March 2016)
Longest unbeaten run within a single season: 32 matches, Nantes (1994–95)
Longest home unbeaten run: 92 matches, Nantes (between 15 May 1976 and 7 April 1981)
Longest unbeaten run: 36 matches, Paris Saint-Germain (between 15 March 2015 and 20 February 2016)

Losses
Fewest losses in a single season: 1, Nantes (1994–95)
Fewest home losses in a single season: 0 (53 times)
Fewest away losses in a single season: 1, Sochaux (1934–35), Saint-Étienne (1969–70), Nantes (1994–95), Marseille (2008–09) and Paris Saint-Germain (2015–16)

Top flight appearances
Most seasons in top flight: 71, Marseille 
Most consecutive seasons in top flight: 47, Paris Saint-Germain (1974–present)

Goals
Highest-scoring season: 
38-match season: 1946–47 (134 goals; 3.51 average per match)
34-match season: 1948–49 (113 goals; 3.71 average per match)
Most goals scored by a team in a single season: 
38-match season: 118, RC Paris (1959–60)
34-match season: 102, Lille (1948–49)
Most goals in a single match: 13
Sochaux 12–1 Valenciennes (1 July 1935)
Marseille 3–10 Saint-Étienne (16 September 1951)
RC Paris 11–2 Metz (19 November 1961)
Fewest goals conceded by a team in a single season: 19, Paris Saint-Germain (2015–16)
Fewest home goals conceded by a team in a single season: 4, Saint-Étienne (2007–08)
Fewest away goals conceded by a team in a single season: 7, Paris Saint-Germain (2015–16)
Best goal difference in a single season: 
38-match season: +83, Paris Saint-Germain (2015–16)
34-match season: +62, Lille (1948–49)

Disciplinary
Most yellow cards in a season: 654 (2002–03)
Most red cards in a season: 131 (2002–03)
Most red cards by a team in a single season: 14, Montpellier (2013–14)

Manager
Most matches managed: 894, Guy Roux (890 for Auxerre (1961–2000, 2001–2005) and 4 for Lens (2007–2008))

Attendance
Highest overall attendance in a season: 8,676,490 (2018–19; 38-match season)
Highest average attendance in a season: 23,154 per match (2000–01; 34-match season)
Highest overall attendance in a single matchday: 307,775 (2018–19 matchday 1; 30,778 average per match)
Highest attendance in a single match: 78,056, Lille v. Lyon at the Stade de France (7 March 2009)

Player statistics

Most appearances

Goalscorers

Most titles won

Eight titles
Marco Verratti (Paris Saint-Germain) (2013, 2014, 2015, 2016, 2018, 2019, 2020 and 2022)

Seven titles
Sidney Govou, Grégory Coupet and Juninho (Lyon) (2002, 2003, 2004, 2005, 2006, 2007 and 2008)
Jean-Michel Larqué and Hervé Revelli (Saint-Étienne) (1967, 1968, 1969, 1970, 1974, 1975 and 1976)
Thiago Silva (Paris Saint-Germain) (2013, 2014, 2015, 2016, 2018, 2019 and 2020)
Marquinhos (Paris Saint-Germain) (2014, 2015, 2016, 2018, 2019, 2020 and 2022)

Goalkeeping
Most consecutive minutes without conceding at home: Jérémie Janot for Saint-Étienne, 1,534 minutes without conceding in 2004–05 and 2005–06 seasons (17 games)
 Most consecutive minutes without conceding: Gaëtan Huard for Bordeaux, 1,176 minutes without conceding in 1992–93 season (13 games)

Goalscoring
Most goals in a single season: Josip Skoblar, 44
Each season: See List of Ligue 1 top scorers
Most goals in a single match: 7, Jean Nicolas, for Rouen against Valenciennes, 1938; André Abegglen, for Sochaux against Valenciennes, 1935
Most games scored in a row: Vahid Halilhodžić (Nantes), 9 matches in a row (1984–1985); Zlatan Ibrahimović (Paris Saint-Germain), 9 matches in a row (2015–2016)

Other records
Most red cards received by a player: 19, Cyril Rool
Youngest player to appear in a match: Kalman Gerencseri, aged  (for Lens against Monaco on 21 August 1960)
 Youngest player to score a hat-trick: Jérémy Ménez, aged  (for Sochaux against Bordeaux on 22 January 2005)
 Fastest goal: 7.9 seconds, Michel Rio (for Caen against Cannes on 15 February 1992)
 Fastest hat-trick: 4 minutes and 30 seconds, Loïs Openda (for Lens against Clermont Foot on 12 March 2023)

References

Ligue 1 records and statistics